Snitter is a village and civil parish in Northumberland, England. It is near the Northumberland National Park. The closest town is Rothbury.

Governance 
Snitter is in the parliamentary constituency of Berwick-upon-Tweed, represented by Ann-Marie Trevelyan, a Conservative elected at the 2015 General Election.

References

Villages in Northumberland
Civil parishes in Northumberland